Josefina Angélica Meabe Ferré de Mathó (15 June 1939 – 31 January 2023) was an Argentine politician and rancher. A member of the Liberal Party of Corrientes, she served in the Senate from 2009 to 2015.

Meabe died in La Paz, Entre Ríos on 31 January 2023, at the age of 83.

References

1939 births
2023 deaths
Women members of the Argentine Senate
Liberal Party of Corrientes politicians
Politicians from Buenos Aires
Members of the Argentine Senate for Corrientes
21st-century Argentine politicians
21st-century Argentine women politicians